The nominees for the 2013 Ovation Awards were announced on September 16, 2013, at the Barnsdall Gallery Theatre in Hollywood, California.  The awards were presented for excellence in stage productions in the Los Angeles area from August 27, 2012 to August 25, 2013 based upon evaluations from 250 members of the Los Angeles theater community.

The winners were announced on November 3, 2013 in a ceremony at the San Gabriel Mission Playhouse in San Gabriel, California.  The ceremony was hosted by actor Michael McKean.

Awards 
Winners are listed first and highlighted in boldface.

Ovation Honors 

Ovation Honors, which recognize outstanding achievement in areas that are not among the standard list of nomination categories, were presented when the nominations were announced.

 Composition for a Play – Michael Redfield – Walking the Tightrope – 24th Street Theatre
 Fight Choreography – Ken Merckx – Cymbeline – A Noise Within
 Puppet Design – Derek Lux and Christian Anderson – Shrek the Musical – 3-D Theatricals
 Video Design – Jeffrey Elias Teeter – On the Spectrum – Fountain Theatre

References 

Ovation Awards
Ovation
2013 in California
2013 awards in the United States